Mohammad Ali Yahyavi Kalkhoran (born 22 March 1962) is an Iranian football goalkeeper who played for Iran national football team and Esteghlal FC. He also played for Iran national futsal team in the 1996 FIFA Futsal World Championship.

Honours

External links
 

Iranian footballers
Iranian men's futsal players
Esteghlal F.C. players
Living people
1962 births
Futsal goalkeepers
Persepolis F.C. non-playing staff
Association football goalkeepers